Yolçubəyli (also, Yëlchubeyli, Yelshbekly, and Yenibeyli) is a village and municipality in the Sabirabad Rayon of Azerbaijan.  It has a population of 3,484.

References 

Populated places in Sabirabad District